Bahušeŭsk , also spelled Bogushevsk is a town in the Syanno District of the Vitebsk Province of Belarus. 

It is situated 33 km to the East of Syanno and 48 km — 70 km by road — to the South of Vitebsk. The population is 2,563 (2017).

Peter Abrassimov, a Soviet war hero and ambassador in China, France, Poland and East Germany, was born in Bahušeŭsk.

References

External links 
 My shetl Bogushevsk on Shtetle

Urban-type settlements in Belarus
Populated places in Vitebsk Region
Polotsk Voivodeship
Mogilev Governorate